Johnsen is a Danish-Norwegian patronymic surname meaning "son of John". Notable people with the surname include:

Arne Odd Johnsen (1909–1985), Norwegian medieval and economic historian
Arve Johnsen (born 1934), Norwegian industrial executive and politician
Bent Inge Johnsen, Norwegian footballer
Bjarne Johnsen (1892–1984), Norwegian gymnast, 1912 Summer Olympics
Britton Johnsen (born 1979), American professional basketball player
Christian Johnsen (born 1977), Norwegian footballer and football manager
Dawn Johnsen, American lawyer
Egil Børre Johnsen, Norwegian writer
Erik Johnsen (born 1965), Norwegian ski jumper
Erland Johnsen (born 1967), Norwegian footballer and football coach
Espen Johnsen (born 1979), Norwegian footballer
Espen Johnsen (politician) (born 1976), Norwegian Member of Parliament for Oppland
Frode Johnsen (born 1974), Norwegian player of the Japanese football club Nagoya Grampus Eight
Görel Johnsen (born 1949), manager of the band ABBA
Grethe Gynnild Johnsen, Norwegian journalist
Hans Johnsen, American Medal of Honor recipient
Harvey M. Johnsen, American federal judge
Håkon Johnsen (1914–1991), Norwegian politician for the Labour Party
James Roland "Jim" Johnsen, American university president
Jarl Johnsen (1913–1986), Norwegian boxer
Jennie Johnsen (born 1977), Norwegian politician for the Liberal Party
Johan Christian Johnsen (1815–1898), Norwegian politician
John Johnsen (1892–1984), Norwegian freestyle and backstroke swimmer
Justin Meldal-Johnsen (born 1970), bassist with the artist Beck
Ketil Melsted Johnsen Motzfeldt (1814–1889), Norwegian Minister of the Navy and Minister of Postal Affairs
Lárus Johnsen (1923–2006), Icelandic chess master
Linda Johnsen (born 1954), American author on yoga and Hinduism
Marius Johnsen (born 1981), Norwegian footballer
Michael Johnsen, Australian politician
Nikolai Johnsen (born 1988), Norwegian television personality
Olaus Johnsen, World War I pilot
Pål Johnsen, Norwegian hockey player
Per Johnsen, Norwegian sprint canoeist
Peter Johnsen, American educator at Bradley University
Robert Johnsen (1896–1975), Danish gymnast, 1920 Summer Olympics
Ronny Johnsen (born 1969), Norwegian footballer
Sigbjørn Johnsen (born 1950), Norwegian politician for the Labour Party
Steinar Sverd Johnsen, Norwegian musician and composer
Theo A. Johnsen (1857–1911) American manufacturer of ski equipment
Tor Gunnar Johnsen, Norwegian footballer
Torhild Johnsen, Norwegian politician for the Christian Democratic Party
Vibeke Johnsen, Norwegian team handball player
Wayne Johnsen (born 1977), American boxer

See also
Castle Bryant Johnsen, television computer artistry group
Peter Johnsen Rooming House, near Sycamore, Illinois
Jensen (surname)
Jenson (name)
Johnson
Jonsen
Jonson

Norwegian-language surnames
Patronymic surnames
Surnames from given names

sq:Gjoni (Gjonaj)